Dan Matheson is a Canadian journalist and news anchor who formerly anchored the news during primetime hours on CTV News Channel, starting from September 2001. On November 17, 2015, his employment with CTV/Bell Media was terminated, along with scores of others.

Biography

Early life and career
He began his broadcast career at CKLY in Lindsay, Ontario as a news and sports director.

CFTO
He left for CFTO in 1976, where he worked on Wide World of Sports. While still working at CFTO, he joined Canada AM where he presented sports news from 1978 until 1986. He continued on as a sports anchor, regularly contributing to Canada AM. In May 1995, he was made a co-host of Canada AM.

CTV
In 1984–85 and 1985–86, he hosted CTV's NHL broadcasts, which included regular season games on Friday nights (and some Sunday afternoons) and partial coverage of the playoffs and Stanley Cup Finals. He also hosted the network's coverage of the 1987 Canada Cup, the 1988 Winter Olympics in Calgary, the 1992 Summer Olympics in Barcelona, and the 1994 Winter Olympics in Lillehammer.

Honors
He earned a 1997 Gemini Award for Best Performance by a Sports Broadcaster for an interview with hockey superstar Wayne Gretzky.

External links
 CTV.ca biography

Canadian television news anchors
Canadian Screen Award winners
Living people
Year of birth missing (living people)
National Hockey League broadcasters
Canadian sports announcers
Canadian Football League announcers
York University alumni
Place of birth missing (living people)
CTV Television Network people
20th-century Canadian journalists
21st-century Canadian journalists